Hanna Mikalayeuna Abrazhevich (born 1 August 2002) is a Belarusian pair skater. Competing for the Czech Republic with her former skating partner, Martin Bidař, she competed in the final segment at the 2019 World Championships.

Programs

Competitive highlights 
 With Bidař for the Czech Republic

 Ladies' singles for Belarus

Detailed results 
ISU Personal Best highlighted in bold.

 With Bidař

References

External links 

 

2002 births
Living people
Belarusian female single skaters
Belarusian female pair skaters
Czech female pair skaters
Figure skaters from Minsk